Odorrana lungshengensis (common names: Lung-shen-hsien frog, Lungshen odorous frog) is a species of frogs in the family Ranidae that is endemic to China. It is found in northeastern Guangxi, southwestern Hunan, and eastern Guizhou. Its natural habitats are hill streams in broad-leaf forests. It is becoming rare due to habitat loss.

References

lungshengensis
Amphibians described in 1962
Amphibians of China
Endemic fauna of China
Taxonomy articles created by Polbot